Mazinger Edition Z: The Impact!, known in Japan as , translated in the Soul of Chogokin toys line as Shin Mazinger Impact Z!, is a Mazinger anime series, directed by Yasuhiro Imagawa (of G Gundam, Giant Robo and Getter Robo Armageddon fame) which premiered in Japan on April 4, 2009. According to the production staff, it has no relation to the 1970s show and should not be described as a Mazinger Z remake. The series is a "retelling" of the basic story of Mazinger Z, featuring most of the same characters, mechanical beasts, and some general plots of the original series, plus some additional material. It keeps the original plot line of Mazinger Z, but makes references to other Go Nagai works, such as Z Mazinger, Devilman, Violence Jack, Mao Dante, Abashiri Family, and others. Elements from other related Mazinger works appear in the series, such as the story of Kedora (based on an original Mazinger Z story by Ken Ishikawa) and the appearance of Energer Z, the original concept before Mazinger Z.

The pair responsible for the shōnen manga Akumetsu, Yoshiaki Tabata and Yuki Yogo, write and illustrate the Shin Mazinger Zero manga. In 2010 a game based on the series was released for the PC.

Plot
In the near future, a mineral known as "Japanium" is discovered under Mount Fuji. This ore is discovered to produce a powerful energy source known as "Photon Energy". Dr. Juzo Kabuto and his associates have begun researching Photon Energy, planning to use it as a solution to the energy crisis plaguing the earth, when the nefarious Dr. Hell and his associate, Baron Ashura attack his lab. Along with this, the mysterious "Kurogane House" also has begun to become entwined with the affairs of these two parties. During all of this, Juzo's grandchildren, Kouji and Shiro, encounter one of Baron Ashura's robots on its way to attack Dr. Kabuto's mansion, where he has begun work on his greatest invention. Dr. Kabuto, seeing the danger at hand, sends out the Pilder to Kouji, allowing him to combine with the giant robot, Mazinger Z, to fight against Dr. Hell's forces.

Characters

Kabuto family
: The protagonist of the story. After the death of his parents, Kouji works hard as the 'Mother Hen' to the surviving members of his family - his brother Shiro, and his grandfather Juzo. Kouji has a high regard for his grandfather, whose patented inventions were the source of the Kabuto family's income and shows zero tolerance to anyone who ever insults his grandfather. During the primary attack of Ashura Corps., Kouji becomes the pilot of his grandfather's greatest invention - the Super Robot Mazinger Z. Like previous incarnations, he is a hot-blooded young man who occasionally acts before he thinks.
: Koji's younger brother.
: Koji's grandfather and the creator of Mazinger Z. Known as a great robotics engineer in addition as the man who discovered the Japanium Ore, which led to the creation of the Photon Energy and Super-Alloy Z (a metal alloy that is stronger than any other metal known to man). Along with Dr. Hell, he uncovered the Mechanical Beasts on Bardos Island but opposed him upon discovering the dangers of the Kedora.
: The son of Juzo Kabuto and father of Koji and Shiro Kabuto. In the original series, Kenzo and his wife are believed to have been killed in an accident involving the construction of Mazinger Z. In reality, Kenzo survived and later built Great Mazinger in secret, without the knowledge of his sons. In Shin Mazinger, he is stated to have died previous to the series and a number of episodes are dedicated to Koji learning of the truth of his death. In the earlier Episodes, Kenzo was shown to be a traitor and followed Dr. Hell. Nishikiori Tsubasa was forced to kill Kenzo with the help and request of Tetsuya. But in Episode 26, it was shown that he is still alive having cut off the infected body that Dr. Hell corrupted during the re-constructuring of his damaged hand. It was revealed that Dr. Hell implanted a Kedora in his hand that controlled his mind. He later reveals to Tsubasa that the Mycenae empire would come if Kouji defeats Dr. Hell.

Photon Power Laboratory
: The daughter of Professor Yumi. She pilots Aphrodite A, a female robot and later the much improved Venus A.
: Sayaka's father, a renowned professor of mechanics, and head of the Photon Power Labs. His name in all previous Mazinger series was read as "Gennosuke", but in the second episode of this series he was called "Yanosuke".
: Renowned leader of all the high-school delinquents in Japan. He comes to Atami because it is the only area in Japan without a gang leader.
 and : The two members of Boss's gang. They are skilled in minor combat techniques as shown in Episode 12.
In the original series, they helped build the Diana A and Boss Borot. In Shin Mazinger, they were the designers of the robots for the Mazinger Army and as such serve as the superiors to the group. They also worked under Tsubasa and designed the first Jet Scrander for Mazinger Z to use for aerial combat. They show having a liking to Kikunosuke of the Kurogane Five.
 & : Female twins who are pilots of Million α (Alpha) and later the improved version Shin Million α. The twins are supporting characters in Shin Mazinger as members of the Mazinger Army who are seen killed in battle in the pilot episode. In the Mazinkaiser OVA series, the twins first appear as assistants to Prof. Yumi and the objects of affection by Koji, Shiro and Boss due to their bustier physiques, much to the annoyance of Sayaka. They survived the final battle after following the plan of Tsubasa and lead the Million Corps against Dr. Hell. They were defeated by the King of Hell but the twins survived in Episode 26.
: Pilot of Baion β (Beta), and later Shin Baion β. He survived the final battle after following the plan of Tsubasa and lead the Baion Corps against Dr. Hell. The Baion Corps were defeated by the King of Hell but Shun survived in Episode 26.
: Pilot of Daion γ (Gamma) and later Shin Daion γ. He survived the final battle after following the plan of Tsubasa and lead the Daion Corps against Dr. Hell. The Daion Corps were defeated by the King of Hell but Masao survived in Episode 26. Although defeated by the King of Hell in Episode 26, the 100 Rocket Punches were implanted in the bodies of the Million Corps, Baion Corps and Daion Corps which, Kouji successfully launched against the King of Hell.

Kurogane house
: Head Mistress of the Kurogane House, a spa in Atami. She and her staff have a mysterious connection with the Kabuto family as well as vast knowledge about Dr. Hell and the Mycenaeans. Tsubasa originally appears in Violence Jack. In later episodes, as the dark secrets of the Kabuto family was revealed, it was told that Tsubasa is the original assistant of Dr. Hell and a well skilled biochemist. She was revealed to be the mother of Kouji and Shiro and the wife of Kenzo Kabuto.
: Staff members of the Kurogane House. They once lived violent lives (gangsters, assassins, etc.) until they met Tsubasa, who saved them from death (or near-death) as a result of their situations. Reborn again, they swore unwavering loyalty to Tsubasa and vowed to serve and protect her, as well as the Kabuto family, with their lives. Each member is also equipped with a Super Alloy-Z weapon created by Tsubasa and Juzo. The Kurogane Five are loosely based on characters who appear in other works of Go Nagai, most notably Violence Jack and the Abashiri Family. The members of the Kurogane Five are:
: Head clerk of the Kurogane House and Tsubasa's right-hand man. Cross provides vital information to Tsubasa regarding the incidents surrounding Atami. He is known to show incredible strength and resilience. His weapon is his own body, now made of Super Alloy-Z.
: Described by Inspector Ankokuji as a "weird Mexican looking guy" (thanks to his appearance of wearing a poncho), Django's role is to bring tourists to the Kurogane House on the outskirts of Atami, as well as recruiting new members to the staff. He is an expert marksman, having an array of guns, rifles, and special ammunitions, and shooting down his targets with pinpoint accuracy. When opposing more powerful opponents, he unleashes his Super Alloy-Z bullets.
: Head chef of the Kurogane House. Though he never speaks, his cooking skills are said to be the best in the world.  He is a master swordsman who has shown extraordinary skills with a blade by slicing a fish into sashimi pieces in a moment and then letting the fish swim in the water still alive despite having its head and bones remaining. In battle, he fights using a Super Alloy-Z sword.
: Working as the House's bath attendant, he is an expert in the use of bombs and grenades. If need be, Yasu can blow himself up using the photon power bomb planted in a Super Alloy-Z chamber in his own body to protect Tsubasa and the Kabutos.
: The Head Waitress of the Kurogane House. Also called "Sister Kiku" by the staff and even Tsubasa herself. Despite her small stature and old age, she is the most feared member of all the Kurogane staff. In battle, she moves at superhuman speed that surpasses even Sensei's and fights with a thin Super Alloy-Z thread used to bond and/or slice apart her opponents. Her character and choice of weapon is loosely based on the characters from the Abashiri Family.

Bardos Island
: Koji's archnemesis. He, along with Juzo Kabuto, discovered Bardos Island, home of the ancient Mycenaeans. Uncovering the Mechanical Beasts, Dr. Hell uses the technology of the Mycenaeans to build his army of giant robots in a campaign for world domination. He seeks the technology being developed at the Photon Power Lab (and more importantly the Japanium ore) to make his armies truly unstoppable. Described by Juzo as a genius biochemist, he is even able to revive the dead.
: Dr. Hell's right hand, Baron Ashura is a half-man, half-woman combination. He/she commands the undersea fortress Saluud and the Ashura Corps, one of the divisions of Dr. Hell's army. A number of episodes are dedicated to revealing Ashura's story (including the events of his/her rebirth and the lives his/her previous halves lived prior to their combination).
: Another loyal servant of Dr. Hell. Brocken is a German cyborg whose head is completely separated from his body. He commands the Ghoul and the Air Division of Dr. Hell's army. Compared to Pygman and Ashura, he is occasionally comic relief (e.g. in one episode his head is taken by Koji and Boss's group and kicked around like a football).
: Third servant of Dr. Hell, a pygmy warrior with a series of bizarre physical abilities.  He takes the form of Jim Mazinger, a character from Violence Jack. Pygman has high regards towards Baron Ashura, and shows his support in Episode 8 when he rescued Ashura from the team of Koji and Tsubasa, and again in Episode 9 as Ashura was punished by Dr. Hell for failing to defeat Mazinger Z numerous times. Unlike his comrades, Pygman does not lead any Mechanical Beasts. Instead, he relies on his mystic powers and physical abilities to advance Dr. Hell's schemes.
: A series of Gynoids serving under Baron Ashura, who regards them as his/her 'daughters'. They were created for the sole purpose of assassinating Koji Kabuto and Tsubasa Nishikiori. Most of them were destroyed during an attack on the Kurogane house and another was defeated by Koji when he, Sayaka and Boss escaped the Saluud. A fairly intact Gamia (called Gamia Q3) was recovered and repaired, eventually fighting alongside Detective Ankokuji (who refers to her as 'My Honey').

Mycenae
: The legendary Greek God. In Shin Mazinger, he is revealed to be a commanding officer of an extraterrestrial army using the Earth as a strategic point in battle against an unknown enemy. He is said to be the cause of the fall of the Mycenaean Civilization when he defied the order of his superior, Uranus, and battled his own men to defend the Mycenaean people. He is also called "Z Mazinger", a name Juzo later used as the inspiration for the creation and naming of his robot, Mazinger Z. He is based on the character Zeus, who appears in the Z Mazinger manga. Zeus's appearance is used as a metaphor to describe Mazinger Z as a god if used to save the Earth. Zeus is also revealed to be one of the three gods that commands Mycenae, the other two being his rival, Hades, and Poseidon.
: A Mycenaean soldier in the form of an alien creature. In the pilot, Kedora describes itself as a being made to destroy other civilizations and manages to take control of Mazinger Z. Kedora first appeared in a Mazinger Z short story by the late Ken Ishikawa.
: In the original series, he leads the Mycenaeans against both Mazinger Z and Great Mazinger. In Shin Mazinger, Gorgon was a subordinate of Zeus who betrays him by offering the body of Tristran (in reality, Baron Ashura) in a manner similar to the Trojan Horse. This caused Zeus to lower his guard to be attacked by Hades.
 and : The previous lives of the Baron Ashura. The names are probably inspired in the romantic narrative Tristan and Isolde.
: One of the three gods of the Mycenae along with Zeus. He's the ruler of Hell and originally appears in the Z Mazinger manga. Hades attempted to eliminate Zeus after the latter lowers his guard from Archduke Gorgon's offering of the body of Tristan (in truth, it was the body of Baron Ashura), but was defeated when Zeus fights back along with assistance from Koji and his Mazinger Z.
: A being of flame, he immediately appears after Hades was defeated by Zeus and Mazinger Z, sinking Bardos Island into the sea. He originally appears in Great Mazinger as the true leader of the Mycenaean Empire.

Other Characters
: A detective who serves to investigate the Kabuto family and later is given orders to protect them. He also serves as a comic relief to the series, having originally appeared in the original 1970's Mazinger Z manga. Unlike the original manga, Ankokuji plays a significantly larger role in the anime. In the first episodes (which occurs in medias res) he is shown to be partnered with the robot doll Gamia Q3, who he calls his "honey". His given name is Yamitaro.
: Dr. Heinrich's daughter and Shiro's love interest. She is a Gynoid who can fuse with Schtroheim's other creation, the giant robot Danube α1 (Alpha 1), and battles Mazinger Z in order to fulfill her father's dream of surpassing Juzo's creation to become the greatest robot engineer of all. Her story and name seem to be inspired in the German poem Die Lorelei by Heinrich Heine.
: A cyborg and former collaborator of Doctor Hell, he is shown with his robot daughter Lorelai while talking to Tsubasa Nishikiori in the first episode. Schtroheim is one of the three great robot engineers in all of Japan (the other two being Juzo Kabuto and his son, Kenzo). Like Tsubasa, Heinrich too has knowledge about the legend of the Mycenaeans. In both Shin Mazinger and in the original series, Schtroheim is a direct rival of Juzo and is determined to surpass the creator of Mazinger Z by any means.
: Previously known only as “Blade”, he's a shadowy figure who appears in the first episode killing Viscount Pygman. He is the pilot of Energer Z and is believed to be also the pilot of Great Mazinger, as the silhouette of the said robot appeared behind him in the background in the first episode. In this series, he is an ace robot pilot who assisted the Kabutos, Dr. Hell, and Nishikori in exploring Bardos Island, and battled Dr. Hell when he made his first bid for World Domination. After his apparent death, Tsubasa learns that he is her lost brother.
: General of the Mycenaean Army. He appears in front of a stunned Koji Kabuto at the very opening of the series. In the original Mazinger Z series, he defeated Mazinger Z in battle as his own army is superior to Dr. Hell's, but was defeated later by Great Mazinger. Great General of Darkness also appears in Mazinkaiser as the main antagonist after the fall of Dr. Hell. His role in the series is not yet fully known. As shown in Episode 2, the damaged Mazinger Z lumbers away from the Great General of Darkness giving a clue to the next Mazinger and Great Mazinger series.
: The demon from the series of the same name. Though not directly involved in the story, Demon Lord Dante's form emerges enveloping Mazinger Z when it is controlled by a Kedora, emphasizing the metaphor of Mazinger Z becoming a devil when used to destroy because of its power.

Anime versions
Along with the TV Tokyo broadcast, a web stream that uses the mms protocol is available in the Bandai Channel exclusively for Japanese users. The version available here, as with other anime, includes extended scenes not seen in the TV broadcast. The Bandai Channel logo of the series does not have the "on television" legend that the TV Tokyo logo has. After episode 15, the contents of both version are the same, with no extra scenes in the Bandai Channel version.

Episodes

Staff
Original work: Go Nagai
Direction/Scenario: Yasuhiro Imagawa
Music: Akira Miyagawa
Opening 1 theme song:  performed by ULTIMATE LAZY for MAZINGER (special group of Lazy, Tamio Okuda, Kazuyoshi Saito and JAM Project)
Ending 1 theme song: Brand New World performed by Natsuko Aso
Opening 2 theme song:  performed by JAM Project
Ending 2 theme song:  performed by SKE48
Sound direction: Tetsu Motoyama
Character design: Shinji Takeuchi
Mazinger & mechanical beast design: Tsuyoshi Nonaka
Art direction: Masatoshi Muto
Director of photography: Yoshito Kuwa
Animation production: BEE·MEDIA, Code
Producer(s): Hasshu Tokuhara, Ichiko Nagai, Satsuki Mizuno, Yoshinaga Minami, Katsumi Koike, Koji Morimoto, Daiki Hasebe
Planning: Takashi Nagai, Shunji Inoe, Kazumi Kawashiro
Series organization: Yasuhiro Imagawa
Narrator: Tessho Genda

Source(s)

Media

Home video
Besides the several video on demand internet services that show the Bandai Channel stream freely in Japan, the series will be released in both DVD and Blu-ray formats. So far two DVDs and one Blu-ray box have been announced.

Discotek Media has licensed the series, which was released on DVD in 2015.

The series is also scheduled for a release on DVD and Blu-ray in Spain and México (only in DVD) as Mazinger Edición Z Impacto!.

The series is available in both DVD and Blu-ray in Italy as "Mazinger Edition Z: The Impact!", by Yamato Video.

Music
Each one of the opening and ending themes have been released as EP CDs. Also the soundtrack is available in CD. All of them have been published by Lantis.

Manga

Shin Mazinger Zero
Although published along the anime series, the manga  is not an adaptation of its story. Written by Yoshiaki Tabata with art by Yuki Yogo, it is an original production which takes elements from several past versions of the Mazinger concept. The plot deals with Humanity being destroyed by an evil Mazinger Z. Koji Kabuto, the last man alive, is killed by a human-sized, human-looking Minerva X so his spirit can travel back in time to prevent the disaster—but it takes several tries. Ultimately, parallel universes become a theme in the story, enabling cameos from several different versions of Mazinger Z, including Gosaku Ota's manga version of Koji (a cyborg) and Nagai's 1990 reimagining of Mazinger Z, Mazin Saga (a man wearing an armor that turns him into a giant). Shin Mazinger Zero also includes guest stars from Nagai's more risqué works, such as the nude warrior Kekko Kamen, and as such, contains high-levels of gore and sexual content. It spawned a sequel entitled , which focuses on Great Mazinger, with cameos from UFO Robo Grendizer and its cast. The sequel is four volumes long and still ongoing as of July 2014.

Mazinger Edition H: The Impact!

References

External links
Shin Mazinger Shogeki! Z Hen  official website
Shin Mazinger Shogeki! Z Hen  at TV Tokyo
Shin Mazinger Shogeki! Z Hen  at Bandai Channel

Shin Mazinger Shogeki! Z Hen  at allcinema
Shin Mazinger Shogeki! Z Hen - Bandai Collectors Division website 

2009 manga
Mazinger
Super robot anime and manga
Seinen manga
Animated television series reboots
TV Tokyo original programming
Discotek Media
Akita Shoten manga